Yeo Bum-kyu (born June 24, 1962) is a retired South Korean football midfielder.

Club career

International career 
He was part of the South Korea squad at the 1988 AFC Asian Cup.

Honours 
K League (2)
Daewoo Royals  1987, 1991

References

External links

FIFA.com Profile
11v11.com Profile

1962 births
Association football midfielders
Living people
South Korean footballers
South Korea international footballers
Busan IPark players
K League 1 players
South Korean football managers
Gwangju FC managers
1988 AFC Asian Cup players
Footballers at the 1988 Summer Olympics
Olympic footballers of South Korea
Yonsei University alumni